Mõisamaa may refer to several places in Estonia:

Mõisamaa, Ida-Viru County, village in Kohtla Parish, Ida-Viru County
Mõisamaa, Jõgeva County, village in Jõgeva Parish, Jõgeva County
Mõisamaa, Lääne-Viru County, village in Rakke Parish, Lääne-Viru County
Mõisamaa, Rapla County, village in Märjamaa Parish, Rapla County

See also
Mõisimaa, village in Lihula Parish, Lääne County